Mondo TV is an Italian production and television distribution company. Founded by Orlando Corradi in 1985 and based in Rome, Mondo TV is a public company, quoted on the STAR segment of the Italian main stock exchange, Borsa Italiana.

It distributes and produces, on its own or in co-production with international networks, cartoon series and feature films for television and theatrical release.  Mondo TV also operates in other related sectors such as music and audiovisual distribution, exploitation, media, publishing and merchandising, and is one of the few branches of Italian audiovisual production companies or groups active in markets outside Italy.

History
In 1964, Orlando Corradi and Kenichi Tominaga found DEA S.n.c., a company active in the audiovisual animation sector, with the aim of acquiring the rights to Japanese animated cartoons for distribution in Italy and Europe.

In 1979 and 1980, respectively, Corradi and Tominaga created the companies Doro TV Merchandising. for large-scale television networks, and Italian TV Broadcasting S.r.l., for smaller-size broadcaster.  The period from the late 1970s to the early 1980s saw the rise in demand for Japanese animated cartoons and the growth of the Italian television market.  The two companies started distributing feature films, TV series and sports events. Mondo TV S.r.l. was founded in 1985 in order to produce animated cartoon series.

In 1990, Doro TV Merchandising created its first animated television series Jungle Book Shōnen Mowgli and Christopher Columbus.  From 1992 on, Mondo TV undertook the production of animated television series.  In late 1999, Mondo TV S.r.l. was transformed into a joint-stock company and then acquired the 100% of the shares of Doro TV Merchandising S.r.l., and on 28 June 2000 its shares make their debut on the Italian stock exchange, Borsa Italiana.

The 2000s saw Mondo TV expands its operations into complementary multimedia and publishing sectors, and its worldwide collaborations and strategic partnerships.  Mondo Home Entertainment S.r.l., for the distribution of video and DVDs, and Mondo Licensing S.p.A., fcr merchandising and publishing, were both created in 2001, followed by Mondo Home Entertainment S.p.A., quoted on the Expandi bourse on 28 February 2005, Moviemax, purchased by MHE in 2006, and MEG Mondo Entertainment Germany for home video distribution in Germany.

In September 2010, Mondo TV launched its own licensing agency in Italy, Mondo TV Consumer Product, for selling the licensing, publishing and merchandising rights of properties owned by the Group itself as well as third parties.  The future will see Mondo TV Group building up its presence in sectors like home video, music, multimedia, children's books, interactive games, ecommerce, merchandising for toys and children's wear, computer games and publishing synergy with cartoon products.

Subsidiaries
The holding company, Mondo TV, has several incorporated subsidiaries:

 Mondo TV France: for the distribution of television programmes in France.
 Mondo TV Iberoamerica: for the distribution of television programmes in Spain and Latin America.
 Mondo TV Suisse: for the distribution of television programmes in Switzerland.
 Feliz Semana Santa y viva Mondo TV.

Production and distribution
The group's activities were initially focused on the distribution of Japanese animations in Italy.  In 1989 the company moved from distribution to distribution and production, and Doro TV Merchandising created its first television series, Jungle Book Shōnen Mowgli, 52 episodes based on the 1894 collection of stories written by Rudyard Kipling, and Christopher Columbus, a 26-episode animated series based on the life of the Italian explorer and navigator.

From 1990 on, Mondo TV undertook the production of animated television series, which saw the release of Robin Hood, based on the outlaw in English folklore and released in 1990, The Legend of Snow White, based on the Brothers Grimm's version of the fairy tale known from many countries in Europe and released in 1994, and, in 1996, The Legend of Zorro, 52 episodes of about 26 minutes each based on the famous character created in 1919 by New York-based pulp writer Johnston McCulley.  The series was co-produced by the animation department of the Japanese film, theater production, and distribution company Toho.

In the following years, Mondo TV released several animated series such as Cinderella, co-produced with Japanese animation company Tatsunoko Production, a 26-episode animated series based on the fairy tale of the same name, "Simba the LionKing" a 52-episode animated series, and the sequels "Simba Jr. goes to the World Cup" a 26-episode animated series and "Winner and the Golden Child" a 26-episode animated series, Jesus: A Kingdom Without Frontiers, co-produced with Institute of Antoniano, Pocahontas, a 26-episode animated series based on the Pamunkey Algonquian princess and Chief Powhatan's daughter from early American history, Sandokan: The Tiger of Malaysia, a 26-episode animated series co-produced with SEK Studio (a North Korean-based animation company), RAI, TF1 and Taurus Film based on the fictional pirate of the late 19th century created by Italian author Emilio Salgari.  And also, Albert the Wolf, a 52-episode animated series co-produced with Rai Trade based on the comic book series created by Guido Silvestri under the pseudonym of John Silver in 1974, and The Black Corsair, a 26-episode animated series based on the book by Emilio Salgari.

In 1999, Mondo TV participated to the International Animation Consortium for Child Rights, "Cartoons for Children's Rights", a collection of 30-second non-verbal animated public service announcements promoted by UNICEF, which illustrates the Convention on the Rights of the Child.  Mondo TV contributed with "Children Have the Right to Survive", based on the Article 6 of the Child Rights Convention.

At the turn of the 21st century, Mondo TV released its first feature film, The Legend of the Titanic, a 90-minute animation that was then followed by its sequel, In Search of the Titanic, in 2004, and by many other feature films.

In 2001, Mondo TV throughout MIM AG and in co-production with NDF, and Caligari Film, launched its 26 episodes series, Letters from Felix, based on the Children's books by Annette Langen and Costanza Droop.  It was followed by two 81-minute each featured films: Felix: All Around the World, released in 2005, and Felix: The Toy Rabbit and the Time Machine, released in 2006.  In 2004 Mondo TV in co-production with RAI launched The Last of the Mohicans, a 26-episode animated series based on the historical novel by James Fenimore Cooper.

That same year Mondo TV released three feature films: Turandot, released in co-produced with Hahn Shin Corporation, is a 90-minute animation based on the 1926 opera in three acts by Giacomo Puccini, Mother Theresa, a 90-minute animation based on and inspired by the life of Mother Teresa, and Genghis Khan, a 90-minute animation based on Genghis Khan, the founder and Great Khan (emperor) of the Mongol Empire.

Mondo TV, to strengthen its commitment to children's education, has produced a series of feature films of particular significance.  Among these there are: Padre Pio, co-produced with North Korean SEK Studio, is a 90-minute animated feature film depicting the life of Pio of Pietrelcina (1887–1968), an Italian Capuchin priest who is venerated as a saint by the Catholic Church; Saint Catherine, a 60-minute animation depicting the life of Saint Catherine of Siena (1347–1380), a tertiary of the Dominican Order, and a scholastic philosopher and theologian.  This film was co-produced by Orlando Corradi, the Rome's LUMSA University and its students attending the "Cartoons: Animation and Managagement" master's degree; Alexander the Great, co-produced with DIFARM, is a 90-minute 3D animated feature based on Alexander the Great, the king of Macedonia.  They were all released in 2006.

These feature films were followed by Karol, a 90-minute 3-D animated feature film with music composed by Luis Bacalov that depicts the life of Pope John Paul II (1920–2005), Welcome Back Pinocchio, a 90 minutes animated feature film based on the fictional character that first appeared in 1883, in The Adventures of Pinocchio by Carlo Collodi, which were both released in 2007, and Saint Anthony, a 90-minute 3-D theatrical feature film released in 2008 and co-produced with DIFARM.  It is based on the life of Anthony of Padua (1195–1231), the Portuguese Catholic priest and friar of the Franciscan Order.  The Journey of J.M. Escrivá, a 60-minute animated feature film that deals with the life of Josemaría Escrivá, the founder of Opus Dei, was released on the following year.

Gawayn, first aired on Rai 2 in 2008, is a French and Italian animated television series co-produced with Alphanim.  The series has been translated into different languages, and its title refers to King Arthur's nephew.

In 2008, Mondo TV also presented its new cartoons at MIPTV Media Market:

Monsters & Pirates is a twenty-six 11-minute episodes animated series co-produced with MPG, an associate of the confectionery giant Ferrero.  It tells the story of two different pirate crews hunting for the same treasure.  DVDs with the first two episodes of the cartoon can be found inside packets of Ferrero snacks, along with characters from the series, which are also available inside the famous Kinder Eggs.

The second series presented, Kim, is a twenty-six-episode, 26-minute series co-produced with Rai Fiction and based on the picaresque novel Kim by Rudyard Kipling.  This was the first time that this story was presented in an animated series.

Angel's Friends is a 52-episode 13-minute comedy-adventure animated series co-produced by Mondo Home Entertainment, Play Entertainment, and Mediaset.  It is based on the comic strip created by Simona Ferri. This series was launched at Mipcom in 2004, together with Sandokan III: The Two Tigers, the third season of the successful series about Salgari's hero co-produced with Rai Fiction.

Another title, in co-production with Giochi Preziosi and MEG Toys, Puppy in My Pocket: Adventures in Pocketville is based on the successfully toy line of ceramic pets.

Mondo TV's animated series Virus Attack is an animated cartoon created to raise awareness of pollution-related problems in the audience of youngsters.  The series consists of 52 episodes of about 13 minutes each and was first aired on 1 April 2011 by Cartoon Network.

Two titles that Mondo TV launched at Mipcom 2011 are Power Buggz, a 26-episode 30-minute children's comedy directed by Orlando Corradi and co-produced with Meg Toys, and Playtime Buddies with the music by John Sposito, a preschoolers 52-episode 13-minute series that encourages the development of positive social interaction and cognitive skills.  According to Meg Toys, this is unlike any other product on the preschool market and will be available on the back-to-school shelves in North America from 2012 and even earlier in other parts of the world.  It was co-produced with Visual Picnic, which holds the rights to the property created by Erik DePrince, and Licensing Works.  Both series were filmed in full HD.

After the death of Orlando Corradi in November 2018, the stock shares passed to Monica Corradi and Matteo Corradi, which already was the President and C.E.O. of the company.

Mondo TV announces the imminent arrival on a number of new channels of its innovative animated action-comedy Invention Story co-produced with Genius Brands International.

Mondo TV announces that Spanish broadcaster RTVE will participate in Annie & Carola co-produced with MB Producciones.

Mondo TV announces that German broadcaster Super RTL joins as commissioning broadcaster on the new computer-animated series Agent 203 co-produced with Toon2Tango.

Library
Mondo TV possesses one of the largest animation libraries in Europe with more than 1,600 episodes of television series and more than 75 feature-length animated films for movie theatre and home video that it owns outright for all the world, and over 5,500 episodes in distribution of famous Japanese cartoons.  The cartoons produced by Mondo TV have always set themselves apart by their questionable quality and content that sometimes goes beyond what should be shown to children.

Feature films

Special releases

TV series

Upcoming

See also

 The Black Corsair
 The Last of the Mohicans#TV
 Lupo Alberto
 Sandokan#TV miniseries
 SEK Studio
 List of science fiction television programs, V
 List of science fiction television programs by genre

References

Sources
Books

 
 
 
 
 

News, magazines, journals and papers

 
 
 
 
 

Related links
 
 

Web resources

 
 
 
 
 
 
 
 
 
 
 
 
 
 
 
 
 
 
 Article 6
 States Parties recognize that every child has the inherent right to life.
 States Parties shall ensure to the maximum extent possible the survival and development of the child.

External links

Business data
 Mondo TV at Google Finance
 Mondo TV at Hoover's
 Mondo TV at Reuters
 Mondo TV at Yahoo! Finance

Companies listed on the Borsa Italiana
Film distributors of Italy
Film production companies of Italy
Italian animation studios
Mass media companies of Italy
Publishing companies established in 1985
Publishing companies of Italy
Mass media in Rome
Italian companies established in 1985